The following lists events that happened during 1876 in New Zealand.

Incumbents

Regal and viceregal
Head of State – Queen Victoria
Governor – The Marquess of Normanby

Government and law
The 1875 general election, which started on 29 December, concludes on 4 January. The 6th New Zealand Parliament commences.

Premier Atkinson abolishes the New Zealand provincial system on 1 November.

Speaker of the House – Sir William Fitzherbet replaces Sir Francis Dillon Bell who did not stand for election at the end of 1875
Premier – Daniel Pollen resigns on 15 February. Julius Vogel takes over until retiring on 1 September and is in turn replaced by Harry Atkinson.
Minister of Finance – Julius Vogel takes over as Treasurer (Minister of Finance) from Harry Atkinson when he becomes Premier on 15 February. When Vogel retires on 1 September Atkinson resumes the position.
Chief Justice – Hon Sir James Prendergast

Main centre leaders
Mayor of Auckland City – Benjamin Tonks followed by William Hurst
Mayor of Christchurch – Fred Hobbs
Mayor of Dunedin – Keith Ramsay followed by Henry John Walter
Mayor of Wellington – William Hutchison

Events 
18 February: The first trans-Tasman submarine communications cable is completed, allowing telegraph communications with the rest of the world.
4 April: Speight's is first brewed in Dunedin.
30 December: The Daily Southern Cross publishes its last issue, and merges with The New Zealand Herald. The Auckland-based newspaper began publishing as The Southern Cross in 1843.

Sport

Cricket
The Otago Cricket Association is formed.

Horse racing

Major race winners
New Zealand Cup – Guy Fawkes
New Zealand Derby – Songster
Auckland Cup – Ariel
Wellington Cup – Korari

Lawn bowls
The first interclub competition in the country is held between the Dunedin and Fernhill clubs.

Rugby union
 Rugby clubs were founded in Marton, Bulls, and Sanson, Oamaru, Hawera, Patea, Invercargill, Otautau, Riverton, Greytown, Masterton, Rangiora, Waimate, Kaiapoi and Te Awamutu.
 A combined side from Canterbury toured Nelson, Wellington (at Lower Hutt), and Auckland (at Ellerslie)

Shooting
Ballinger Belt – Private J. Willocks (Clutha)

Births
 21 January: Tom Cross, rugby union and rugby league player.
 24 February: Ernie Booth, rugby union player.
 23 March: Sally Low, social reformer and peace campaigner.
 6 April: Harold Williams, linguist.
 11 April Michael Reardon, political activist
 7 June: Albert Samuel, politician

Deaths 
 26 August: Henry Balneavis, soldier
 22 November: Charles Flinders Hursthouse, author and settler.

See also
List of years in New Zealand
Timeline of New Zealand history
History of New Zealand
Military history of New Zealand
Timeline of the New Zealand environment
Timeline of New Zealand's links with Antarctica

References
General
 Romanos, J. (2001) New Zealand Sporting Records and Lists. Auckland: Hodder Moa Beckett. 
Specific

External links